Jeremy Mark Hutson is noted for his research into ultra cold physics and he heads up the Cold Molecules Theory research group. His research led to  his appointment as a Fellow of the Royal Society
He is a fellow of the Institute of Physics and is currently Professor of Chemistry and Physics at Durham University.

Honours and awards
1991: awarded the Corday–Morgan Medal of the Royal Society of Chemistry. 
2007: Kołos Medal
2010: elected Fellow of the Royal Society.
2011: awarded Tilden Prize of the Royal Society of Chemistry.
2016: award Institute of Physics Joseph Thomson Medal and Prize

References

Living people
British physicists
Academics of Durham University
Fellows of the Royal Society
Year of birth missing (living people)